The Lake Mansion in Reno, Nevada, is a historic house that originally stood at the corner of Virginia and California Streets and is now located at 250 Court Street.  It was built in 1877 by W.J. Marsh.  It includes Late Victorian and Italianate architecture and was a home associated with Myron Lake, one of Reno's founders, who bought it in 1879.

In 1971 the house was moved to the grounds of the Convention Center, on the corner of Kietzke Lane and Virginia Street, and in 2004 it was moved again, to its current location. It was wrapped on three sides by a veranda, which was lost in the move, but which was intended to be replaced.
Despite its having been moved, it was listed on the National Register of Historic Places in 1972.

References 

National Register of Historic Places in Reno, Nevada
Victorian architecture in Nevada
Italianate architecture in Nevada
Houses completed in 1877
Houses in Reno, Nevada
Houses on the National Register of Historic Places in Nevada
1877 establishments in Nevada